Nogometni klub Metalleghe-BSI, formerly known as Nogometni klub Maestral-BSI is a professional association football club from the city of Jajce that is situated in Bosnia and Herzegovina.

The club is currently competing in the First League of Central Bosnia Canton, the country's fourth-tier league, after stepping out of the First League of the Federation of Bosnia and Herzegovina because of financial difficulties. Metalleghe-BSI also spent one season in the Premier League of Bosnia and Herzegovina, the country's top-tier league. The club plays its home matches on the Mračaj Stadium, which has a capacity of 3,000 seats.

Honours

Domestic

League
First League of the Federation of Bosnia and Herzegovina:
Winners (1): 2015–16
Second League of the Federation of Bosnia and Herzegovina:
Winners (1): 2013–14

References

External links
NK Metalleghe-BSI at Soccerway

Jajce
NK Metalleghe-BSI
Football clubs in Bosnia and Herzegovina
Association football clubs established in 2009
2009 establishments in Bosnia and Herzegovina